The Adelaide Metro A-City 4000 Class is a class of electric multiple unit trains built by Bombardier Transportation (later Alstom) in Dandenong, Victoria for the electrified Adelaide Metro rail network. They are currently the only class of operational electric trains in South Australia.

History 
In March 2011, Bombardier Transportation was awarded a contract to build 22 three-carriage trains for the Adelaide rail network, that was in the process of being electrified.

The design uses a similar shell to that of the V/Line VLocity diesel multiple unit trains, introduced in 2004. The first of the Adelaide trains was delivered in July 2013, and entered service on 23 February 2014. The last was completed in October 2015. The trains currently operate services on the Seaford, Flinders and Gawler lines.

When they were ordered, it was proposed that the Gawler line would be electrified, which would allow the trains to access Adelaide Metro's Dry Creek depot. However, before they were delivered, that project was temporarily cancelled. Whilst light maintenance was performed at their primary stabling point at Seaford, heavy maintenance needed to occur at Dry Creek. When required, each train was hauled there from Adelaide station by a pair of 3000 class railcars. This movement was ceased once the Gawler Line was electrified in 2022. In June 2019, a further 12 train sets were ordered, the first of which being delivered in mid-late 2021.

References

External links 

Bombardier Transportation multiple units
Electric multiple units of South Australia
Train-related introductions in 2014
Transport in Adelaide
25 kV AC multiple units
Alstom multiple units